Enping, alternately romanized as Yanping, is a county-level city in Guangdong province, China, administered as part of the prefecture-level city of Jiangmen.

Its diaspora accounts for around 420,000 overseas Chinese, particularly in the Americas. The area around Enping is known for its many hot springs.

Geography
Enping is located in southwest Guangdong, at the western edge of the Pearl River Delta and beside the South China Sea. Enping borders Kaiping to the northeast and Yangjing to the southwest.

History
EnpingCounty was established in AD220. Under the Qing, it made up part of the commandery of Zhaoqing and was one of the Four Counties responsible for much of the early Chinese diaspora from Guangdong in the 19th century. Many overseas Chinese trace their ancestry to Enping, particularly among the Chinese in Venezuela. Migrants from Enping and their families make up about 200,000 of the country's estimated 400,000 Chinese. Emigration to Venezuela occurred primarily in the decades including and following the World Wars, with the largest batch leaving at the end of the Cultural Revolution in the late 1970s. Enping was made a county-level city in 1994. The Enping financial crisis later in the decade led to a massive scandal and the loss of financial services in the city.

Administrative divisions
Enping comprises 10 towns, 3 sub-district offices, 4 farms and stations, and 174 village neighborhood committees.

Climate

Demographics
Enping is a part of the Greater Taishan Region or Sze Yap Region, which includes Kaiping, Xinhui, Enping and Taishan.

Notable people
 Ekin Cheng: Hong Kong actor and singer
 Katherine Sui Fun Cheung: First Asian American woman aviator
 Feng Ru: pioneering Chinese aviator and aircraft designer
 Douglas Jung: Canadian politician and member of the Canadian Parliament
 Peter T. Poon: Renowned Chinese American space scientist
 Harry Shum Jr.: Costa Rica-born American actor and dancer
 John Shum: Hong Kong film producer and political activist
 Tang Wensheng: America-born Chinese diplomat

Notes

References

Citations

Bibliography
 , reprinted 2000.
 .

External links 
 

 
County-level cities in Guangdong
Siyi
Jiangmen